Karen Dotrice (born 9 November 1955) is a British actress. She is known primarily for her role as Jane Banks in Walt Disney's Mary Poppins, the feature film adaptation of the Mary Poppins book series. Dotrice was born in Guernsey in the Channel Islands to two stage actors. Her career began on stage, and expanded into film and television, including starring roles as a young girl whose beloved cat magically reappears in Disney's The Three Lives of Thomasina and with Thomasina co-star Matthew Garber as one of two children pining for their parents' attentions in Poppins. She appeared in five television programmes between 1972 and 1978, when she made her only feature film as an adult. Her life as an actress concluded with a short run as Desdemona in the 1981 pre-Broadway production of Othello.

In 1984, Dotrice retired from show business to focus on motherhood – she has three children from two marriages – though she has provided commentary for various Disney projects and has resumed making public appearances, including a cameo in Mary Poppins Returns in 2018. She was named a Disney Legend in 2004.

Early life
Born into a theatre family, Dotrice is the daughter of Kay ( Katharine Newman) and Roy Dotrice, two Shakespearean actors who met and married while performing in repertory productions in the UK. Her father also was born in the Channel Islands. She has two sisters, Michele and Yvette, both of whom are actresses. Her godfather was actor Charles Laughton, who was married to Elsa Lanchester, one of the co-stars of Mary Poppins.

Her father, Roy was a Wireless Operator serving with 106 Squadron of the Royal Air Force and along with his other six crew was shot down and taken prisoner of war on the night of 2/3 May 1942.

Dotrice was a toddler when her father joined the Shakespeare Memorial Theatre (later the Royal Shakespeare Company) in 1957. By age four, she was ready to perform, making her début in an RSC production of The Caucasian Chalk Circle by Bertolt Brecht. There, a Disney scout saw Dotrice and brought her to Burbank, California, to meet Walt Disney.

Career

Film

At age 8, Dotrice was hired in 1963 to appear in The Three Lives of Thomasina as a girl whose relationship with her father is mended by the magical reappearance of her cat. While Dotrice was in California, her father stayed in England – where he was portraying King Lear – and Walt Disney personally took care of her family, often hosting them in his Palm Springs home. Dotrice took quickly to Disney as a father figure, calling him "Uncle Walt". She said the admiration was mutual: "I think he really liked English kids. He was tickled pink by the accent and the etiquette. And when I was being very English and polite, he would look proudly at this little child who had such good manners."

Film historian Leonard Maltin said Dotrice "won over everyone" with her performance in The Three Lives of Thomasina, and she was signed to play Jane Banks (along with once and future co-star Matthew Garber as her brother, Michael Banks) in Mary Poppins (1964). Disney's part-live-action, part-animation musical adaptation of the Poppins children's books by P. L. Travers starred David Tomlinson as a workaholic father and Glynis Johns as a suffragette mother who are too busy to spend much time with their children. Instead, they hire a nanny (Julie Andrews) who takes Jane and Michael on magical adventures designed to teach them – and their parents – about the importance of family. Poppins was Disney's biggest commercial success at the time and won five Academy Awards, making its stars world-famous. Dotrice and Garber were praised for their natural screen presence; critic Bosley Crowther wrote, "the kids ... are just as they should be," while author Brian Sibley said, "these charming, delightful young people provided a wonderful centre for the film."

Dotrice and Garber paired up a third time in The Gnome-Mobile (1967) as the grandchildren of a rich lumber mogul who stumble across a gnome forest and help to stop the gnomes from dying off. Starring Walter Brennan in a dual role, The Gnome-Mobile failed to perform on a par with Poppins at the box office, and Dotrice did not make another film appearance as a child.

After The Gnome-Mobile, "the kids" no longer kept in contact with each other. In an interview for the 40th Anniversary Edition DVD release of Mary Poppins, Dotrice recalled how she learned of Garber's 1977 death:

In another interview she recalled:

In 1977, credited as Karen Dotrice Nalle, she appeared with Ann-Margret in Joseph Andrews, a British film based on the Henry Fielding novel Joseph Andrews. 

Dotrice appeared as Alex Mackenzie in The Thirty Nine Steps (1978) with Robert Powell and John Mills. The third film based on the John Buchan novel, this was her only feature film as an adult. In the film, Alex accompanies Hannay (Powell) while on the run from "both the spies and the police".

Television
In 1974, Dotrice appeared as Désirée Clary in the Thames Television serial Napoleon and Love. The nine-hour, dramatised account of Napoleon I of France starred Ian Holm and Tim Curry.

Also in 1974, she appeared alongside Helen Mirren and Clive Revill in Bellamira. The following year, Dotrice played housemaid Lily Hawkins in six episodes of Upstairs, Downstairs during its fifth and final season. The series, a narrative of the upper class Bellamy family and their servants in Edwardian and later England, was one of the most popular programmes produced by London Weekend Television for ITV. It also proved popular when shown in the United States on Masterpiece Theatre, and was "beloved throughout much of the world."

Dotrice took on the role of Maria Beadnell in two episodes of the serial Dickens of London (1976), starring her father as both Charles and John Dickens. In 1977 she appeared as Princess Ozyliza in the Jackanory episode "The Princess and the Hedgehog".

In 1978, Dotrice made her final screen appearance for some years as an actress, playing Jenny in the BBC2 Play of the Week, She Fell Among Thieves. Starring Malcolm McDowell and Eileen Atkins, Thieves made its U.S. début on 5 February 1980 – the first film screened as part of the PBS Mystery! series.

Later career
In 1981, Dotrice took the role of Desdemona in the Warner Theatre production of Othello opposite James Earl Jones and Christopher Plummer. Reviewers were less than kind; calling her "the only serious let-down" in the cast, David Richards of The Washington Post wrote, "Dotrice is not Desdemona. She is a Desdemona doll, reciting her lines in a thin, reedy voice and moving through the tragedy with a rare somnolence." Dianne Wiest took the role in the 1982 Broadway production and received similar reviews.

Dotrice virtually disappeared from public life following her retirement. She was married to English actor Alex Hyde-White from 1986 to 1992; they have a son, Garrick. In 1994, Dotrice married then-Universal Studios executive Edwin "Ned" Nalle and later gave birth to two children, Isabella and Griffin.

Her voice work includes spoken-word adaptations of Disney's The Little Mermaid, Beauty and the Beast and Pocahontas; a sing-along release of Mary Poppins; an interview for the ABC television special Walt: The Man Behind the Myth; and narration for the audiobook adaptation of Dangerous Women by George R. R. Martin. She appeared as herself in the 2009 film The Boys: The Sherman Brothers' Story. As for acting, however, "I'll never go back," she told Hello! magazine in 1995, "because you don't have to put on any make-up."

Dotrice was coaxed back into the spotlight twice in 2004: she was named a Disney Legend at a ceremony in Burbank (at which Matthew Garber was honoured posthumously), and she was interviewed and provided audio commentary for the 40th Anniversary Edition Mary Poppins DVD release. Dotrice also provided audio commentary for the Acorn Media DVD release of Upstairs, Downstairs Series 5, discussing Episode 7 ("Disillusion"), the final episode in which she appears.

Despite having retired from acting, Dotrice's official website announced in 2014 that she will be making public appearances "for the first time in 50 years". The list includes memorabilia shows, signings and corporate events.

Looking back
Almost a half-century after Poppins, and just in time for its 50th anniversary Blu-ray re-release and the theatrical release of Saving Mr. Banks, Dotrice, who had since moved to Brentwood, California, told the Los Angeles Times that it wasn't until seeing  Saving Mr. Banks that she truly understood why Walt Disney was the father figure she remembered. "I didn't know P. L. Travers' history" with Disney and his many years spent trying to convince Travers to let him tell the Poppins story on film. Dotrice noted a common thread; Travers was eight years old when her father died, and Walt Disney's father put him to work when he was eight. "I was eight when I did the film. I think P. L. Travers was trying to fix families [with the Poppins books, and Disney] wanted to heal people through his movies. Here I am 50 years later looking at this – I was crying when I was watching the film." In 2018, she appeared on a television special of Mary Poppins Returns: Behind the Magic -- A Special Edition of 20/20 which aired on 22 November 2018 on ABC. She makes a cameo appearance in Mary Poppins Returns as an elegant lady who passes by the main characters on Cherry Tree Lane and asks for directions to #19. Talking about the cameo, Dotrice said, "Now that Mary Poppins is back it feels like she was here all along. She was in our hearts all along, that's for sure. I think her timing is immaculate, the world has never needed her more and so she's done it practically perfectly."

That experience stood in contrast to her memories of working on Poppins. "The joy that you see on the screen is the joy we felt." Dotrice recalled having a difficult time staying in character whenever Dick Van Dyke would do one of his "goofy dances". She also thought it odd that Julie Andrews was a smoker. "Everybody smoked back then. I have memories of Mary Poppins smoking a cigarette".

Still, in hindsight, Dotrice said she would never have done Poppins or any of her other films if she had it to do over again. She said children "should be learning and growing at their own pace" rather than "living in a Justin Bieber-esque-type world surrounded by a bunch of 'yes' people". Dotrice had seen so many of her peers struggling with "all sorts of demons" while growing up that she didn't want her children becoming actors. She said she gave up her own career when she was asked as a teenager to appear topless on screen.

Filmography

Awards

See also
Matthew Garber

References

External links
 
 
 
 Disney Legends profile
 Reel Classics: "Whatever Happened to..."

1955 births
Living people
20th-century English actresses
21st-century English actresses
Audiobook narrators
Disney people
English child actresses
English film actresses
English stage actresses
English television actresses
Guernsey women